Edward Younger may refer to:

 Edward Younger, 3rd Viscount Younger of Leckie, Scottish nobleman
 Edward F. Younger, American soldier selected to choose the body that would become the Unknown Soldier